The 7th National Congress of the Lao People's Revolutionary Party (LPRP) was held in Vientiane from 12 to 14 March 2001.  The congress occurs once every five years. A total of 452 delegates represented the party's nearly 100,000 card-carrying members.

References

Congresses of the Lao People's Revolutionary Party
2001 in Laos
2001 conferences